Ram Balram is a 1980 Indian Hindi-language action film directed by Vijay Anand, which starred Dharmendra and Amitabh Bachchan in pivotal roles along with the supporting cast including Zeenat Aman and Rekha. The film marked the third time in which Dharmendra and Bachchan worked together after their previous films, Chupke Chupke and Sholay. The movie surfaced as one of the highest-grossing films of the year, and was clarified a superhit by box-office analysts.

Plot
Ram and Balram are two young boys who live with their loving parents. Their scheming uncle, Jagatpal, however, kills the boys' parents. Jagatpal lies to the boys that their parents have been killed in an accident and promises to raise them himself.

He enrolls the younger brother Balram in school and eventually sends him off to join the police force. The older brother Ram becomes a mechanic. Jagatpal has a tight hold on the boys, even when Ram is an adult, he still gives all his wages to his uncle and is only allowed to keep a few rupees for pocket money.

When Balram returns as a fully fledged police officer, Jagatpal finally reveals his plan. He is going to use Ram to target the biggest smugglers in India. Now that Balram is a police officer, he will protect his brother from getting arrested. Balram has reservations, but Jagatpal threatens to beat him just as he did when he was a boy; he has a needle at the edge of his cane and whenever the boys would do something Jagatpal dislikes, he would put the pointy and dangerous needle on the boys' neck.

Balram is still unhappy with Jagatpal's plan, so he tells his superiors in the police force that his brother intends to infiltrate the smuggler's underworld so that Balram can arrest them. Ram becomes a police informer for Balram.

The plan goes well. Ram becomes one of the lieutenants of one of the biggest smugglers Sulaiman and Balram's excellent arrest rate makes him one of the force's most successful officers. Jagatpal becomes enormously wealthy from Ram's illicit gains.
The brothers also find love. Balram with Shobha, the daughter of a college professor and Ram with Madhu, a girl who has moved to the area with her mother looking for her father. Unbeknownst to Ram, the girl believes her father to be Jagatpal. She, along with her courtesan mother, attempt to extort money for Jagatpal but he refuses to believe he is the father. His suspicions are confirmed when he catches the mother paying off a former customer. The man is confronted by Jagatpal and confesses that the girl is not Jagatpal's daughter.

Jagatpal's plan comes unstuck however when the boys' mother returns. She did not die after all. She reveals Jagatpal's actions to the two brothers and they unite to take him down.

Cast
Dharmendra as Ram aka Bholu Ram
Amitabh Bachchan as Inspector Balram
Zeenat Aman as Madhu
Rekha as Shobha
Ajit as Jaggu / Chaudhary Jagatpal Singh
Amjad Khan as Sulaiman
Prem Chopra as Chandan Singh
Sujit Kumar as Daku Satarawala
Utpal Dutt as Professor (Shobha's Father)
Asit Sen as Inspector Mukherjee
Urmila Bhatt as Saraswati Devi
Helen as Tarabai

Soundtrack
Music composed by Laxmikant-Pyarelal. Lyrics penned by Anand Bakshi.

References

External links

1980s Hindi-language films
Films directed by Vijay Anand
Films scored by Laxmikant–Pyarelal
1980s masala films